Ankadikely Ilafy is a rural municipality in Analamanga Region, in the  Central Highlands of Madagascar. It belongs to the district of Antananarivo Avaradrano. It is situated at 8 km North of Antananarivo at the National road 3 and its populations numbers to 96,247 in 2018.

The commune is divided in 18 fokontany (villages).

Sights
Rova d'Ilafy

References
 (in French:) Monographie de la Commune

Populated places in Analamanga